Chidleyenoceras is a Middle Ordovician tarphyceroid with a closely coiled, evolute shell; whorl section subquadrate, widest just above a broadly rounded venter; dorsum with a broad shallow impression; sutures moderately spaced, weakly sinuous; siphuncle large, subventral, apparently orthochoantitic with tubular segments.

The tubular, subventral siphuncle separates Chidleyenoceras from the Apsidoceratidae (Sweet, 1964) where it had been included and puts it well into the Plectoceratidae (Flower, 1984).

References

 Flower, (1984). Bodeiceras; a New Mohawkian Oxycone, with Revision of the Older Barrandeocerida and Discussion of the Status of the Order.  Journal of Paleontology v. 58, no.6, pp 1372–1379, Nov. 1984.
 Walter C Sweet, 1964  Nautiloidea-Barrandeocerida;  Treatise on Invertebrate Paleontology Part K Mollusca 3. Geological Society of America and University of Kansas Press.

Prehistoric nautiloid genera
Ordovician cephalopods
Ordovician cephalopods of North America
Paleozoic life of Newfoundland and Labrador